Elijah Isaacs (17301799) was a farmer, politician from Wilkes County, North Carolina, and militia officer in Wilkes County Regiment of the North Carolina militia during the American Revolution.

Early life
Elijah Isaacs was likely born near Berryville, Virginia where in 1771 he sold the farm inherited from his father Samuel Isaacs Jr.  By September 1775 he was in Surry County, North Carolina, and a member of the Surry County Committee of Safety with Benjamin Cleveland and Joseph Winston.

He had a younger brother named Godfrey Isaacs.  His wife's name may have been Mary.  He had the following children:  Jinny Isaacs, George Isaacs, Samuel Isaacs, II, Winny Isaacs, Abbee Isaacs, Elijah Isaacs, and Rebecca Isaacs.

In 1777, he built Fort Defiance on the Yadkin River in Caldwell County, North Carolina.  William Lenoir later built a home on the site of Fort Defiance.

Military service
Military service
 Captain in the Surry County Regiment of the North Carolina militia, 1776-1777
 Captain in the Wilkes County Regiment of militia, 1777-1778
 Major in the Wilkes County Regiment of militia, 1778-1779
 Lt. Col./Colonel in the Wilkes County Regiment of militia, 1779-1783

Lieutenant Colonel Elijah Isaacs was Colonel Benjamin Cleveland’s second in command of the Wilkes County Regiment of militia during the American Revolution.  In August 1780, Isaacs led the Wilkes County regiment under Brigadier General Griffith Rutherford, commander of the Salisbury District Brigade of militia in western North Carolina.  Two days before the Battle of Camden (South Carolina) Isaacs’ regiment was detached from Major General Horatio Gates' army to reinforce Colonel Thomas Sumter.  Elijah Isaacs was captured when Lieutenant–Colonel Banastre Tarleton defeated Sumter’s forces at the Battle of Fishing Creek on August 18, 1780.

Lieutenant Colonel Isaacs and General Rutherford, who was captured at the Battle of Camden, were held at St. Augustine, Florida until exchanged in July 1781.  From October 1781 through February 1782, Isaacs led a militia regiment fighting against Colonel David Fanning's Tories in Chatham County, North Carolina and Randolph County, North Carolina.

Political career
He was a representative to the North Carolina General Assembly from Wilkes County in 1778, 1779, and 1780.  He served as senator in the assembly in 1782 and 1783.  In May 1778, he introduced a bill in the House of Commons to form Wilkes County, which was formed in 1779 from parts of Surry County and Washington District, North Carolina.

Death
After the American Revolution ended Elijah Isaacs bought land in Georgia and may have lived there briefly.  By 1790 he was living in Anderson County, South Carolina, where he is believed to have died in 1799.

References

 
 NCDAR, ROSTER OF SOLS FROM NC IN THE AM REV, PP 392, 393
 CLARK, STATE RECS OF NC, VOL 15, PP, 391, 392
 , citing p. 8, NARA microfilm publication M637, (Washington D.C.: National Archives and Records Administration, n.d.), roll 11; FHL microfilm 568,151.

1799 deaths
People from Berryville, Virginia
Year of birth unknown
People from Wilkes County, North Carolina
North Carolina militiamen in the American Revolution
Members of the North Carolina House of Representatives
North Carolina state senators